The role of Xiao Huangmen was a role for a eunuch in the Han dynasty. The position, with a salary-rank of 600 shi or dan, involved delivering and receiving messages between the imperial palace apartments and the outside court.

A Xiao Huangmen's responsibilities were to follow the emperor, receive Shangshu memorials, preach the emperor's orders, and handle communication between the emperor and the harem inside and outside the palace.

The position's responsibilities and level of authority changed over time.

Noted Xiao Huangmen
Cai Lun (–121 CE)
Ten Attendants (mid-second century CE)
Cao Jie (125 - 181 CE)

Notes

References

Sources
 
 

Han dynasty eunuchs
Chinese imperial harem